Everett Russell "Shorty" Cowell (September 24, 1897 – July 15, 1931) was an American football and basketball coach. He served as the football coach at Sterling College in Sterling, Kansas from 1926 to 1927, compiling a record of 8–8. Cowell was also the head basketball coach at Ottawa University in Ottawa, Kansas from 1923 to 1925, tallying a mark of 16–20. He attended Kansas State Agricultural College—now known as Kansas State University—where lettered in football, basketball, and baseball.

Early life and playing career
Cowell was born in Clay Center, Kansas on September 24, 1897 to Jasper Cowell, originally of England, and his wife, Effie. He was an alumnus of Kansas State Agricultural College—now known as Kansas State University—where he graduated from in the field of "animal husbandry" in 1921. During his time at Kansas State, Cowell played on the school's baseball team in the 1919 and 1920 seasons, the football team from 1917 to 1920 and also the basketball team from at least 1918, to his graduation year of 1921. He had also earned nine total letters in baseball and football. On the football field, Cowell, nicknamed "Shorty", was said to have "a combination of physique, speed and football sense", rendering him a very effective halfback. His brother, Warren (Brady) also played on the team in 1920, as a halfback. Cowell was also an accomplished varsity basketball player, having been named to the All-Missouri Valley varsity team in 1918 and 1919 seasons as a guard. He was a member of the Delta Tau Delta fraternity.

Coaching career
Prior to his graduation and during his years as a player, Cowell coached a football team in his hometown of Clay Center. Upon graduation from college, Cowell coached football at Norton High School in Norton, Kansas, from 1921 to 1922. In 1923, Cowell accepted a position at Ottawa University in Ottawa, Kansas as an assistant under coach Edwin Elbel, when it was stated that he had "one of the best football teams in the state". He remained at Ottawa until the conclusion of the 1925 football season, when he resigned in protest of a new university policy that would require the coach to teach at the college as well. He was then hired at Sterling to succeed Warren Woody for the 1926 season. Cowell was the head football coach at Sterling College in Sterling, Kansas for two seasons, from 1926 to 1927, compiling a record of 8–8.

In 1927, Cowell was elected vice president of the Mid-Continent Athletic Association. He died on July 15, 1931 and was buried at Greenwood Cemetery at Clay Center.

Head coaching record

College football

References

External links
 

1897 births
1931 deaths
American men's basketball players
American football halfbacks
American football quarterbacks
Guards (basketball)
Kansas State Wildcats baseball players
Kansas State Wildcats football players
Kansas State Wildcats men's basketball players
Ottawa Braves basketball coaches
Ottawa Braves football coaches
Sterling Warriors football coaches
High school football coaches in Kansas
People from Clay Center, Kansas
Coaches of American football from Kansas
Players of American football from Kansas
Baseball players from Kansas
Basketball coaches from Kansas
Basketball players from Kansas